Oxbow Park is a public park in the Georgetown neighborhood of Seattle, Washington.  It houses the landmark Hat 'n' Boots roadside attraction, which was relocated to the park.

References

External links

Park project information at Seattle Parks Dept.

Georgetown, Seattle
Parks in Seattle